The Huntsville Otters are a Canadian Junior ice hockey team from Huntsville, Ontario. Starting from the 2016-17 season the Otters are members of the Provincial Junior Hockey League. Prior to this change they were members of the Georgian Mid-Ontario Junior C Hockey League after resigning from the Ontario Junior Hockey League in the Spring of 2012.

History
Joining the ranks of Junior hockey in 1990, the Muskoka Bears were a member of the Metro Junior A Hockey League. Prior to this, the team had played Junior C hockey.

The team made hockey history on February 21, 1997 when their goalie, Ryan Venturelli, became the first goaltender to score two goals (both empty-net) in a hockey game against the Durham Huskies during the Metro Junior A Hockey League 1996–97 regular season.

From 1997 until 2004, the franchise was called the Huntsville Wildcats. The team never truly found their groove, and folded halfway through the 2003–04 season after 23 straight loses and a goals-against average of roughly 10.

For the 2004–05 Season, the team reformed as the Huntsville-Muskoka Otters after Sherwood Bassin, Ray Irwin and Tom McCarthy took ownership.

In 2007, the team was sold to local businessmen Kris House and Jason Armstrong, who shortened the team's name to the Huntsville Otters.

The town of Huntsville hosted the 2011 Ontario Junior A Dudley Hewitt Cup on the weekend of April 18–23, 2011 at the Don Lough Arena, Canada Summit Centre. The Otters went 3-0, and received a bye to the final but lost the championship  to the Wellington Dukes 5-3.

In March 2012, it was announced that the Huntsville Otters were to be contracted from the Ontario Junior Hockey League when a local group successfully applied to bring the team to the Georgian Mid-Ontario Junior C Hockey League.

Season-by-season results

Playoffs

MetJHL Years
1991 DNQ
1992 Lost Semi-final
Muskoka Bears defeated St. Michael's Buzzers 4-games-to-3
Bramalea Blues defeated Muskoka Bears 4-games-to-none
1993 Lost Semi-final
Muskoka Bears defeated Aurora Eagles 4-games-to-2
St. Michael's Buzzers defeated Muskoka Bears 4-games-to-none
1994 Lost Semi-final
Muskoka Bears defeated St. Michael's Buzzers 4-games-to-2
Caledon Canadians defeated Muskoka Bears 4-games-to-2
1995 DNQ
1996 Lost Quarter-final
Caledon Canadians defeated Muskoka Bears 4-games-to-2
1997 Lost Preliminary
Caledon Canadians defeated Muskoka Bears 4-games-to-none
1998 Lost Preliminary
Thornhill Rattlers defeated Huntsville Wildcats 3-games-to-1
OJHL Years
1999 DNQ
2000 Lost Division Quarter-final
Collingwood Blues defeated Huntsville Wildcats 4-games-to-3
2001 Lost Division Quarter-final
Thornhill Rattlers defeated Huntsville Wildcats 4-games-to-none
2002 Lost Division Quarter-final
Newmarket Hurricanes defeated Huntsville Wildcats 4-games-to-none
2003 DNQ
2004 Did Not Finish Season
2005 Lost Division Semi-final
Huntsville-Muskoka Otters defeated Collingwood Blues 4-games-to-1
Aurora Tigers defeated Huntsville-Muskoka Otters 4-games-to-2
2006 Lost Division Quarter-final
Newmarket Hurricanes defeated Huntsville-Muskoka Otters 4-games-to-1
2007 Lost Division Quarter-final
Newmarket Hurricanes defeated Huntsville-Muskoka Otters 4-games-to-1
2008 Lost Division Semi-final
Stouffville Spirit defeated Huntsville Otters 4-games-to-3
2009 Lost Conference Final
Huntsville Otters defeated Toronto Dixie Beehives 3-games-to-none
Huntsville Otters defeated Aurora Tigers 4-games-to-2
Huntsville Otters defeated Orangeville Crushers 4-games-to-1
Kingston Voyageurs defeated Huntsville Otters 4-games-to-1
2010 DNQ OJAHL Playoffs
2011 Lost Qualifier, Hosted and Lost Dudley Hewitt Cup Final
Orangeville Flyers defeated Huntsville Otters 2-games-to-none
First in Dudley Hewitt Cup round robin (3-0)
Wellington Dukes defeated Huntsville Otters 5-3 in final
2012 Lost Division Quarter-final
Markham Waxers defeated Huntsville Otters 3-games-to-none

References

External links
Otters Webpage

Huntsville, Ontario
Ontario Provincial Junior A Hockey League teams
1990 establishments in Ontario
Ice hockey clubs established in 1990